is a railway station on the Seibu Shinjuku Line in Shinjuku, Tokyo, Japan, operated by the private railway operator Seibu Railway.

Lines

During the daytime off-peak, the station is served by six trains per hour in either direction.

Station layout
The station consists of two ground-level side platforms serving two tracks.

Platforms

History 
The station opened on 16 April 1927.

Station numbering was introduced on all Seibu Railway lines during fiscal 2012, with Shimo-Ochiai Station becoming "SS03".

Passenger statistics
In fiscal 2013, the station was the 64th busiest on the Seibu network with an average of 11,221 passengers daily.

The passenger figures for previous years are as shown below.

Surrounding area
 Tokyo Fuji University
 
 Hikawa Shrine
 
 Kanda River

References

External links

 Shimo-Ochiai Station information (Seibu Railway) 

Railway stations in Tokyo
Railway stations in Japan opened in 1927